Willy Rozenbaum (born 25 June 1945) is a Polish-born French physician.

A co-discoverer of the human immunodeficiency virus (HIV) with Jean-Claude Chermann of Luc Montagnier's team, he has since 19 November 2003 held the chair of France's "conseil national du SIDA" (National Council on AIDS) and before that had since 1989 practiced in the infectious and tropical diseases service at l'Hôpital Tenonfr and been professor of infectious and tropical diseases at l'Hôpital Saint-Antoine in Paris.

Selected publications

References 

French infectious disease physicians
French people of Polish-Jewish descent
1945 births
Living people
HIV/AIDS researchers